Parajubaea is a genus of flowering plant in the family Arecaceae.

They are native to the northern Andes mountains in northwestern South America.

Species
The genus Parajubaea contains the following species:

References

External links

 
Arecaceae genera
Flora of the Andes
Taxonomy articles created by Polbot
Taxa named by Max Burret